APF, or apf, may refer to:

Organizations
 Aboriginal Publications Foundation, a former arts and publishing body in Australia (1970–1982)
 Alicia Patterson Foundation, an annual journalism foundation and award
 Alliance for Peace and Freedom, a far-right European party
 American Healthcare Professionals and Friends for Medicine in Israel
 Anglican Pacifist Fellowship, established 1937
 Anguilla Police Force, renamed the Royal Anguilla Police Force in 1990
 Anti-Privatisation Forum, former South African body
 Armed Police Force, a paramilitary land force in Nepal
 Assemblée parlementaire de la Francophonie, an international association of French-speaking parliaments
 Association of Professional Futurists

Sports
 Arena Pro Football, an American indoor football league that merged to form the American Arena League in 2018
 Asociación Paraguaya de Fútbol, the Paraguayan Football Association

Technology
 APF Electronics Inc., a defunct American consumer electronics company
 Automated Planet Finder, a telescope
 APF Imagination Machine, a video game console and home computer system
 Atomic packing factor, in crystallography

Codes
 APF, the IATA code for Naples Airport (Florida) in the state of Florida, US
 apf, the ISO 639-3 code for the Paranan Agta language spoken in the northern Philippines
 APF, the National Rail code for Appleford railway station in the county of Oxfordshire, UK

Other uses
 Alaska Permanent Fund, a state-run permanent fund in Alaska
 American Police Force, a fraudulent entity
 Asset purchase facility, for Bank of England quantitative easing
 Australian Pharmaceutical Formulary, the national formulary used by pharmacists in Australia

See also